Chibi North railway station is a railway station serving Chibi, Xianning, Hubei Province, China. It is on the Wuhan–Guangzhou high-speed railway, a segment of the Beijing–Guangzhou high-speed railway. The station opened in 2009.

Railway stations in China opened in 2009
Railway stations in Hubei
Stations on the Wuhan–Guangzhou High-Speed Railway